The grey-eyed bulbul (Iole propinqua) is a species of songbird in the bulbul family, Pycnonotidae.
It is found in Southeast Asia in its natural habitat of subtropical or tropical moist lowland forests.

Taxonomy and systematics
The grey-eyed bulbul was originally described in the genus Criniger and classified by some authorities within the genus Hypsipetes.

Subspecies
Five subspecies are currently recognized:

 I. p. aquilonis - (Deignan, 1948) — southern China and north-eastern Vietnam
 I. p. propinqua - (Oustalet, 1903) — from eastern Myanmar to southern China, northern Thailand and northern Indochina
 I. p. simulator - (Deignan, 1948) — eastern Thailand and southern Indochina
 I. p. innectens - (Deignan, 1948) — far southern Vietnam
 I. p. myitkyinensis - (Deignan, 1948) — north-eastern and eastern Myanmar

References

grey-eyed bulbul
Birds of South China
Birds of Indochina
grey-eyed bulbul
Taxonomy articles created by Polbot